Cyril Morton may refer to:

 Cyril Morton (priest) (1885–1932), Anglican priest
 Cyril James Morton (1903–1986), New Zealand filmmaker
 Cyril S. Morton (1885–1947), British clergyman and philatelist